The 2019 Paul Hunter Classic was a professional non-ranking invitational snooker tournament. The event took place between 24 and 25 August 2019 at the Stadthalle in Fürth, Germany. The tournament was the 2019 edition of the Paul Hunter Classic first held in 2004 as the Grand Prix Fürth. The tournament is named in honour of snooker professional, Paul Hunter who won the 2004 event and died in 2006. The event featured a 16-player bracket with a qualification tournament that was held in Nuremberg, Germany. As the tournament was dropped as a ranking event, independent promoters Dragonstars Event Management promoted the event providing prize money for the tournament.

Kyren Wilson was the defending champion, having defeated Peter Ebdon 4–2 in the 2018 final. Barry Hawkins won the title 4–3 defeating Wilson in the final. Wison lead 3–2 and required one frame to win the title, he was one ball from winning but lost the frame 64–65 and incredibly Hawkins won the decider to win the title. The event also featured an exhibition Speed Snooker Cup tournament which ran concurrently with the main event, which was won by Gary Wilson. Barry Hawkins scored the highest  of the event, a 120 in the third round of the final.

Tournament format
The 2019 Paul Hunter Classic was a professional snooker tournament held on 24 and 25 August 2019 at the Stadthalle in Fürth, Germany. Having been a ranking event since 2010, the event was changed to an invitational basis, with no ranking points allocated. This was because the WPBSA did not want to finance a ranking event with 128 players with a small prize fund. Independent promoter Dragonstars Event Management promoted the event providing the prize money, then the WPBSA added their sanction to the event. The Paul Hunter Classic was named after deceased snooker professional, Paul Hunter, who won the event in 2004, before passing in 2006. A total of 15 players were invited to compete in the event, with one qualifier, who had won a qualifying event featuring 36 participants. 13-year-old Iulian Boiko won the qualifying event, defeating Barry Pinches in the final 3–2. Pinches also had the highest break of qualifying, a 109.

The defending champion of the event was Kyren Wilson, having defeated Peter Ebdon 4–2 in the previous year's final. Wilson was invited to compete in the event.  Both Shaun Murphy and Matthew Stevens were invited to play but pulled out of the event. They were replaced by Ricky Walden and Gary Wilson respectively. Murphy later revealed that he pulled out of the event due to tearing his Achilles tendon, dancing to Disney's Greatest Hits. All matches held in the event were played as best-of-7-.

An exhibition Speed Cup event featuring the same players was played concurrently with the main event, with matches played as best-of-5-frames. The players were also against the clock. Gary Wilson won this event, defeating David Gilbert in the final 3–0. The event was broadcast online-only on the Eurosport Player.

Prize fund
The event features a total prize fund of €13,500 and €5,000 awarded to the winner. This was a significant reduction from the previous year's total prize fund of £100,000 total prize pool, due to the event no longer being a ranking event. The breakdown of prize money for this year is shown below:

 Winner: €5,000
 Runner up: €2,500
 Semi-finals: €1,000
 Quarter-finals: €500
 Last-16: €250
 Total: €13,500

Tournament summary
The 2019 Paul Hunter Classic was held over two days, with the first round held on 24 August and the quarter-finals through to the final on 25 August. Three amateur players were invited to play, in Ryan Davies, Florian Nüßle and Ben Mertens. One additional place was awarded via a qualifying event that was held in Nuremberg, Germany. Iulian Boiko won the qualifying event, defeating Barry Pinches 3–2 in the final.

All four amateur players failed to win a single frame, with Boiko losing to Ricky Walden, Mertens to Joe Perry, Davies to Mark King and Nüßle to defending champion Kyren Wilson with all matches finishing 4–0. In the other four first-round matches, Dominic Dale defeated Matthew Selt, Luca Brecel defeated Ken Doherty, David Gilbert defeated Michael Holt and Barry Hawkins defeated Gary Wilson (all 4–1). The quarter-finals featured Luca Brecel and Barry Hawkins both win 4–1 over Ricky Walden and Mark King respectively. Kyren Wilson defeated Dominic Dale and Joe Perry defeated David Gilbert 4–3. The final four players were all part of the world top-16. Kyren Wilson defeated Luca Brecel 4–1, whilst Barry Hawkins defeated Joe Perry 4–3.

The final was played between Wilson and Hawkins. Wilson won the first frame, before Hawkins won the next two frames, including the highest break of the tournament – a 120 in frame 3. Wilson won the next two frames with two 50+ breaks. Leading 3–2 Wilson made a break of 57 points in frame 6, one pot from winning the event, however, failed to pot the next shot with Hawkins winning the frame by a single point with a clearance of 41 to win the frame 65–64 to force a deciding frame. Hawkins won the frame and the event with a break of 69.

Hawkins commented after the match "To win a title early in the season puts me in good stead." He also commented that his sights were on winning the two following events to be held in China, the International Championship and the China Championship. However, Hawkins would only reach the quarter-finals at the China Championship and lose in the first round of the International Championship.

Main rounds
The competition was played with best-of-7-frames matches. Players in bold denote match winners.

Final

Century breaks
A total of seven  were made during the event. Barry Hawkins made the highest break of the tournament, a 120.

 120, 113, 101  Barry Hawkins
 108  David Gilbert
 104  Ricky Walden
 102, 102  Luca Brecel

References

2019
2019 in snooker
2019 in German sport
August 2019 sports events in Germany